Lake Dora may refer to:
 Lake Dora (Tasmania)
 Lake Dora (Western Australia)
 Lake Dora (Florida)